Firdous e Bareen was the name of the ancient Persian garden, supposedly located in the fortress of Alamut, in the Elburz mountains of Northern Iran, in which Hassan-i-Sabah and his band of Nizari Ismaili Shiite Hashshashin took refuge.

According to some accounts, this Paradise garden, imitating paradise or heaven, was furnished with all luxuries of life, even a rivulet of wine, and was used to recruit Sabah's assassins. The recruit was drugged to simulate "dying," only to later awaken in a garden and be served a sumptuous feast by virgins. The supplicant was then convinced he was in Heaven and that Sabah was a minion of the divinity, and that all of his orders should be followed, even to death.

The novel Firdaus-e-Bareen, written by Indian Muslim novelist Abdul Halim Sharar, gives a biographical account of Hussain, a youth lured and captured by Sabah's men and then forced into his assassination machinery.

Firdous e Bareen is also a song on the album In the Absence of Truth by the American post-metal band Isis.

Persian gardens in Iran
Paradise gardens in Iran